The list of provincial parks of Vancouver Island contains the provincial parks located on the island, which is part of the province of British Columbia. It includes parks from the seven regional districts of Alberni-Clayoquot, Capital, Comox Valley, Cowichan Valley, Nanaimo, and the island portions of Mount Waddington and Strathcona. These parks are administered by BC Parks under the jurisdiction of the Ministry of Environment and Climate Change Strategy.

Parks

Alberni-Clayoquot Regional District

Capital Regional District

Comox Valley Regional District

Cowichan Valley Regional District

Regional District of Nanaimo

Regional District of Mount Waddington

Strathcona Regional District

External links 

Map of provincial parks on Vancouver Island on env.gov.bc.ca

 
Provincial parks
British Columbia, Vancouver Island
Provincial parks